Chandai Dam, is an earthfill dam on Chandai Nalla river near Varora, Chandrapur district in the state of Maharashtra in India.

Specifications

Purpose
 Irrigation

See also
 Dams in Maharashtra
 List of reservoirs and dams in India

References

Dams in Chandrapur district
Dams completed in 1983
1983 establishments in Maharashtra